John William Steakley, Jr. (July 26, 1951 – November 27, 2010) was an American science fiction author. He published two major novels, Armor (1984) and Vampire$ (1990); the latter was the basis for John Carpenter's Vampires movie. He published four short science fiction and fantasy stories.

Personal life 
Steakley was born in Cleburne, Texas. Aside from brief spells in South America and Hollywood, Steakley lived most of his life in Texas.  Steakley's father owned a Chevrolet dealership in Dallas from 1962 until he sold it in 1999. Steakley attended St. Mark's School and graduated from Colorado Academy, a boarding school in Denver. He then went on to study at Westminster College in Missouri, and at Southern Methodist University, where he received his BA in English.

In 1988, Steakley married photographer Lori Jones; they held their wedding reception in the showroom of a local Subaru dealership. He was an avid golfer and in the mid-1990s carried a single-digit handicap.  He died after a five-year battle with liver disease.

Career 
Steakley's sister told the press that he went to Hollywood at the invitation of screenwriter L.M. "Kit" Carson. He sold a film treatment, and played a bit part ("Local 1") in at least one film, Don't Open the Door!, but "he stayed out there a few years and just hated it." Following through on his childhood fantasy of becoming a science fiction writer, Steakley returned to Texas, and wrote. He published his first professional short story, "The Bluenose Limit", in the March 1981 issue of Amazing Stories; and another, "Flyer", in the September 1982 issue. He published two major novels, Armor (1984) and Vampire$ (1990).  According to his website, he worked on the incomplete Armor II for years.

Steakley wrote the screenplay for the 1997 film, Scary Texas Movie; he also played a nameless bit part in that film. Steakley also played a nameless bit part in the 2000 film Playing Dead.

In 1998, John Carpenter directed a screen adaptation of Vampire$ (retitled Vampires), which starred James Woods as the leader of a Catholic Church-sanctioned team of vampire hunters.

Selected works 
 Armor (December 1984, DAW Books)
 Vampire$ (November 1990, Roc Books)

See also
 Notable alumni of St. Mark's School of Texas

References

External links

John Steakley entry at The Encyclopedia of Science Fiction, 3rd edition (draft)

Fantastic Fiction author page

1951 births
2010 deaths
20th-century American novelists
American male novelists
American science fiction writers
People from Cleburne, Texas
Novelists from Texas
Westminster College (Missouri) alumni
Southern Methodist University alumni
American male short story writers
20th-century American short story writers
20th-century American male writers
St. Mark's School (Texas) alumni
Colorado Academy alumni